Listen to Jane Z Live is the first live album by Chinese singer Jane Zhang, released on 4 June 2012 by Universal Music China.

Track listing

References 

2012 live albums
Jane Zhang albums